Daniel Smart Fante (February 19, 1944 – November 23, 2015) was an American author and playwright. He was born in Los Angeles.

Biography
Fante was the son of novelist John Fante whose writing came back into vogue after Charles Bukowski declared him "my God", and wrote the introduction to the reprint of Fante's seminal novel about life in Los Angeles, Ask the Dust.

Chump Change, Mooch, 86'd and Spitting Off Tall Buildings comprise a tetralogy about Fante's hard living alter-ego Bruno Dante. Chump Change found publication in France originally, before being published in the US by Sun Dog Press. All four of the books were eventually republished in America by Harper Perennial and by United Kingdom publisher Canongate.  Short Dog is a collection of short stories about Fante's life as a cab driver in LA.

Besides novels and short stories, Fante also wrote plays – "The Closer / The Boiler Room" described by the Los Angeles Times as "ferociously profane", and "Don Giovanni", about which 3:AM Magazine said: "For those who want to know what is REALLY going on in post-modern American literature right now, Don Giovanni should be essential reading".  Both plays are published in book form by Long Beach publisher Burning Shore Press. He is also the author of A Gin-Pissing-Raw-Meat-Dual-Carburetor-V8-Son-Of-A-Bitch From Los Angeles, a volume of poetry on Wrecking Ball Press.

He died on November 23, 2015, in Los Angeles at the age of 71.

Bibliography
Chump Change (1998)
Mooch (2001)
Spitting Off Tall Buildings (2002)
Short Dog: Cab Driver Stories from the L. A. Streets (2002)
Gin Pissing, Raw Meat, Dual Carburettor V-8 Son-of-a-Bitch from Los Angeles (2002), poetry
Renewal, Bottle of Smoke Press (2005), Short Story
Don Giovanni: A Play (2006)
Kissed by a Fat Waitress (2008), poetry
86'd (2009)
John Fante & The Hollywood Ten, Bottle of Smoke Press (2010), Essay
Fante: A Family's Legacy of Writing, Drinking and Surviving (2011)
 Point Doom (2013)

References

External links

Official homepage
Dan Fante: An American Writer (a documentary directed by Flavio Sciolé)
New York Times review of Short Dog
Interview of Dan Fante on NPR's Fresh Air with Terry Gross, September 29, 2009.
Interview with Dan Fante by Ben Myers
Interview with Dan Fante by Tony O'Neill
 Interview with Dan Fante by Rob Woodard
Hand-written interview at ifpthendirt
Interview with Dan Fante by Alex Kudera

20th-century American novelists
1944 births
2015 deaths
Writers from Los Angeles
21st-century American novelists
20th-century American dramatists and playwrights
American male novelists
American male dramatists and playwrights
American male short story writers
20th-century American short story writers
21st-century American short story writers
20th-century American male writers
21st-century American male writers